Madhu Muskan (meaning Sweet Smiles in English) was an Indian weekly comic magazine from the Gowarsons Group of Companies, which had a circulation of up to 100,000 in the late 1970s.

History and profile
Madhu Muskan was started by the publisher Gowarsons in 1972. The magazine was headquartered in New Delhi. It was first published fortnightly and then weekly.

Though not a comic in the strict literary sense, Madhu Muskan was more than a magazine, almost nearer to any comics published. 90% of the pages contain illustrated comical stories featuring various characters popular at the times. Just 4-5 pages contains the stories in the form of a magazine, and rest as mentioned above were in the form of the comics.

Madhu Muskan was mostly a funny magazine, designed with a view of family readers' entertainment. It was a very popular magazine. At the times when comics industry was at boom, and people had interests in reading this form of literature, the magazine too featured some stories in the form of pictures, but Madhu Muskan mainly relies on the comical stories alone.

The Gowarsons Group also held the Indian rights to Archies and Asterix amongst a number of other titles

Characters and themes
The characters of Madhu Muskan were mainly humorous. Though one detective story feat. Babloo was also there, rest of the characters were designed to make people laugh. The comic also used to carry stories in the magazine format on various themes. The 1970s and 1980s saw the blossoming of several such characters. Following short comics series were published under each Madhu Muskan issues:
 
Daddy Ji - Daddyji appeared in Madhu Muskan for almost 25 years. Daddy ji was the most popular and prime character in Madhu Muskan. He used to be featured on the cover of each and every issue of Madhu Muskan. "Everybody could relate to the bumbling full-of-himself Daddyji as a character like that exists in every family, " says Daddyji's creator Harish M Sudan who modelled the character on his brother-in-law. "As for the plots, I didn't have to look far, since every day, there was a situation in our family that provided a spark for ideas," he says. Taking the family connection further, Sudan named his daughter Yoyo and dog Bhobho to rhyme with Daddyji's son, Jojo — an important character in the comic and often the source of Dadyji's predicaments. He was a humorous character later appeared in Manoj Comics as a famous comic writer with the name of 'Uncle Charlie'. Also, there was his boss Malik Saheb.
Babloo - Babloo was a teen detective (sometimes a child detective). Often as common with this kind of stories, he has an uncle in the police as Superintendent of Police. Who always seek his help in solving the mysteries and arresting the criminals. He was a popular character and he too appeared in every issue of Madhu Muskan.
Popat-Chaupat - Popat-Chaupat were the ill-fated (Kismat ke Maare) comic duo, who are always surrounded by the money problems or the others. There pathetic situation arises the element of fun and humour in the comics.
Sustram-Chustram - As the name implies, yet another comic duo surrounded with problems all the time.  Whereas Chustram is always over energetic i.e. Chust, 'Sustram' was the laziest person i.e. Sust. Because of his behavior he was always beaten by Chustram.
 Bhootnath Aur Jaadui Tulika - Bhootnath was a Bhoot i.e. a ghost who had a magical paint brush called 'Tulika'. 'Tulika' always wanted to make his master happy and tried to fulfill his wish but in every episode, in spite of Tulika's genuine efforts to please Bhootnath, he always ended in trouble in a humorous way. They were one of the popular characters of Madhu Muskan.
 Minni was a small girl character you can recognize with Pran's Pinki. A very clever, mischievous and helpful little girl.
 Manglu Madari Aur Bandar Bihari
 Dakoo Paan Singh - A fun loving, danger loving, pan-chewing Dakoo Pan Singh used to get super-human strength when he ate a paan. Paan's which his trusty side-kick Supari Lal could whip up in a matter of seconds. Dakoo Pan Singh had a multitude of enemies that he battled, some of the more memorable ones being, Madam Motallo (a fat lady who could turn herself into a bouncing ball and flatten everything she bounced on), Serpa Soongh (a snake man who controlled snakes), Cheenku (he could sneeze down most things provided he put a little bit of pepper in his nose) and Jadugar Jhundu (an evil Magician). The author was Murli Sundram, an artist, sculptor, cartoonist and author.
 Filmi Reporter Kalamdas- A reporter of Bollywood actors and actresses, his work was to take interviews of different movie stars. All movie stars come under comic names and were always foolish and fun. EX Rajesh Ganna (sugarcane) instead of Rajesh Khanna, Sanki (Maniac) Pandey instead of Chunkey Pandey, Lekha (written) instead of Rekha, and so on. Kalamdas was popular funny character.
 Chandru
 Jasoos Chakram and Chirkut (his dog)
 Bharat Kumar
 Aakashveer Shaktimaan
 Jasoos Dalda

Comics publication
After seeing the popularity of their comic characters in Madhu Muskan, their publishers started publication of full-fledged comics. They started with the name 'Mudhu Muskan Comics' under which they released several issues of characters 'Babloo', 'Daku Paan Singh','Chandru', 'Popat-Chaupat' and other Madhu Muskan characters. They came out with one more publication called 'Trishul Comics' which consisted of characters like 'Bharat Kumar','Inspector Azaad', etc. They started yet another publication with the name 'Gowarsons Comics' under which they published the famous foreign titles in Hindi. 'Gowarsons Comics' has titles of 'Asterix', 'The Famous Five', 'Lucky Luke' and 'Khalifa Haroon-Al-Paasha and Iznogoud'.

References

1972 establishments in Delhi
Biweekly magazines published in India
Defunct magazines published in India
Hindi-language magazines
Indian comics
Indian comics titles
Magazines about comics
Magazines established in 1972
Magazines with year of disestablishment missing
Magazines published in Delhi
Weekly magazines published in India